In episodic television, a bottle episode is produced cheaply and restricted in scope to use as few regular cast members, effects and sets as possible. Bottle episodes are usually shot on sets built for other episodes, frequently the main interior sets for a series, and consist largely of dialogue and scenes for which no special preparations are needed. They are commonly used when one script has fallen through and another has to be written at short notice, or because of budgetary constraints. Bottle episodes have also been used for dramatic effect, with the limited setting and cast allowing for a slower pace and deeper exploration of character traits and motives.

Use
The term "bottle show" was coined by Leslie Stevens, creator and executive producer of 1960s TV series The Outer Limits, for an episode made in very little time at very little cost, "as in pulling an episode right out of a bottle like a genie". The earliest known use of the term "bottle episode" dates from 2003.

Bottle episodes are sometimes produced to allow as much of the budget as possible to go to the more expensive episodes of the season. Scott Brazil, executive producer of The Shield, described bottle episodes as "the sad little stepchild whose allowance is docked in order to buy big brother a new pair of sneaks". They can also be used to incorporate major current events into the flow of a long-running series, such as the episode of The West Wing following the September 11 attacks, or the episode of Chicago Fire in response to the COVID-19 pandemic.

Examples

The BBC soap opera EastEnders has a tradition of "two-hander" episodes stretching back to 1986, which consist of a dialogue between two characters, typically in a single location.

The BBC sitcom One Foot in the Grave has a bottle episode in the fourth series, in February 1993, where only the main character Victor Meldrew (Richard Wilson) appears.

Seinfelds "The Chinese Restaurant" was refused by NBC numerous times, almost causing Larry David to leave the show. The episode is viewed as a classic and said to have "[broken] new ground" for both the show and sitcoms.

The Mad About You episode "The Conversation" (season 6, episode 9) was a single-shot bottle episode, originally shown on broadcast TV in 1997 with no interruptions. During the credits, Paul and Jamie are watching a TV show and he comments on how difficult it is to do a single-shot, 20-minute scene, and she insists that "It's their job!"

The third-season premiere of The West Wing was delayed by the September 11, 2001 terrorist attacks in the United States. When the season did return, the first episode was a bottle episode titled "Isaac and Ishmael", in which the main cast paid tribute to those affected by the attacks and informed viewers about what to expect from the delayed premiere. Set almost entirely in the White House Mess Hall, the main characters explore the motivations and nuances of terrorism.

The popularity of the Friends bottle episode "The One Where No One's Ready" led the producers to create at least one bottle episode in each season.

The bottle episode on Brooklyn Nine-Nine, "The Box", is rated as one of the best by its viewers.

In a seventh season episode of the American comedy television series Parks and Recreation titled "Leslie and Ron", Leslie Knope and Ron Swanson are locked in a room together overnight to force them to deal with their rivalry.

Several early episodes of The X-Files were conceived as bottle episodes, including "Space", "Darkness Falls" and the well-received "Ice", although these ran over budget.

Bottle episodes from Star Trek: The Original Series (Star Trek: TOS) are known for occasionally becoming popular with fans. Examples include "Charlie X", "Journey to Babel", "The Changeling", "Elaan of Troyius" and "Is There in Truth No Beauty?". The phenomenon has persisted to a lesser extent in later incarnations, with "Duet" (Star Trek: Deep Space Nine) being celebrated as "[a]rguably one of the best episodes of Deep Space Nine and a jewel in the entire Trek canon".

The third story of Doctor Who, The Edge of Destruction, was a bottle episode created in different circumstances from most. The series had been picked up for thirteen episodes by the BBC, and the previous two stories had contained eleven episodes between them; hence, a two-part story was needed. It only featured the main cast of four. Doctor Who has also had occasional bottle episodes since then, most notably "Midnight", which, apart from bookend scenes at a holiday resort, is set entirely on a shuttle bus, with a monster depicted only via sound effects and the acting of the guest cast.

The third-season episode "Fly" of Breaking Bad features only two members of the main cast (plus a few extras) and takes place almost exclusively in the secret laboratory used to cook crystal methamphetamine. Although widely acclaimed by critics, this episode was the lowest rated episode of the entire series. Series creator Vince Gilligan has referred to this as a bottle episode, noting that the limited setting and cast allowed for a slower pace and deeper exploration of character traits and motives:

Even if financial realities didn't enter into it, I feel as a showrunner that there should be a certain shape and pace to each season, and the really high highs that you try to get to at the end of a season—the big dramatic moments of action and violence, the big operatic moments you're striving for—I don't think would land as hard if you didn't have the moments of quiet that came before them. The quiet episodes make the tenser, more dramatic episodes pop even more than they usually would just by their contrast.

Archers fifth episode of the sixth season, "Vision Quest", features seven of the eight major cast members stuck in an elevator in real time.

The comedy-drama series Girls features four bottle episodes. In "One Man's Trash" (season 2, episode 5), series lead Hannah Horvath (Lena Dunham) experiences a two-day romance with Joshua (Patrick Wilson), a handsome doctor whom she meets at her workplace, at his brownstone home. "Beach House" (season 3, episode 7) sees Hannah and friends Marnie Michaels (Allison Williams), Jessa Johansson (Jemima Kirke) and Shoshanna Shapiro (Zosia Mamet) spending the weekend at Marnie's mother's friend's beach home on Long Island. "The Panic in Central Park" (season 5, episode 6) sees Marnie encounter her ex-boyfriend, Charlie (Christopher Abbott, who was a series regular for the first two seasons), by chance. The two then on a series of misadventures throughout New York City; the episode only features the two characters for much of the runtime. "American Bitch" (season 6, episode 3) takes place entirely in the home of famous writer Chuck Palmer (Matthew Rhys), the subject of an article written by Hannah which accuses him sexual misconduct involving his female fans. Hannah and Chuck engage in a mental battle of wits over the article with latter accusing the former of helping to damage his reputation. As with the previous example, they are the only two characters featured in nearly the entire episode. 

The comedy-drama series Leverage had three bottle episodes. "The Bottle Job" (season 2, episode 11) uses only three locations: Nathan Ford's (Timothy Hutton) apartment; McRory's, the bar it sits over; and the bar's backroom. It also alludes to the concept by forcing the Leverage team to execute a late betting or "wire" con, which normally takes days or weeks just to set up, in only an hour and a half; Ford explicitly calls it "the wire in a bottle". (Ford, a recovering alcoholic, also reverts to drinking as part of the con; "hitting the bottle" is an expression for heavy drinking.) "The Cross My Heart Job" (season 4, episode 9) sees the team confined to an airport with no equipment or other resources, fighting to stop a transplant heart from going to a terminally ill defense contractor who's had it stolen from its intended recipient. And finally, "The Broken Wing Job" (season 5, episode 8) has Parker (Beth Riesgraf) working to foil a kidnapping while stuck at home with a broken leg, while the rest of the team is on a job in Japan.

A meta-example is Communitys eighth episode of its second season, "Cooperative Calligraphy". After the opening, characters Jeff Winger (Joel McHale) and Abed Nadir (Danny Pudi) both refer to the situation as a bottle episode. The entire episode is set inside a study room of the college with only the main cast. Its plot centers around the pen of the character Annie Edison (Alison Brie) going missing as she refuses to let anyone else leave the study room until they come forward with it.

Another meta-example is Teen Titans Go!s twenty-ninth third-season episode, titled "Bottle Episode". Its plot centers around the main characters being trapped in a literal glass bottle, and passing the time by reminiscing about previous episodes (making it also a clip show). The episode breaks the fourth wall multiple times with dialogue referencing the expense of television production, giving production staff a break, and the need to fill episodes that fall through.

In the animated series SpongeBob SquarePants there is a bottle episode named "Idiot Box" (season 3, episode 4). SpongeBob and Patrick play with their imaginations inside a cardboard box for the plot of the episode. Only 3 main characters are featured and the episode takes place majorly inside and outside Patrick's house and the cardboard box.

The sitcom Frasier made use of bottle episodes, notably "My Coffee With Niles" (season 1, episode 24), an homage to the film My Dinner with Andre that consists almost entirely of a conversation between Frasier and Niles at Cafe Nervosa, and "Dinner Party" (season 6, episode 17) which takes place wholly within Frasier's apartment.

The Peep Show episode "Nether Zone" (series 7, episode 4) takes place almost entirely inside a block of flats, as Mark and Jez are locked inside, unable to get to Mark's baby's christening.

The BoJack Horseman episode "Free Churro" features the title character giving a monologue in front of a static background for 20 minutes of the episode's 26-minute runtime. The entire episode was voiced by a single voice-actor.

Long running ABC drama Grey's Anatomy had a bottle episode in its thirteenth season. The episode focused on Doctors Grey, Edwards, Webber and Hunt as they perform surgery. The episode remains in the operating room as each doctor remembers different moments in their lives. 

The Chicago Fire episode "My Lucky Day" was a bottle episode designed to cut higher costs because of the impact of the COVID-19 pandemic on television in the United States.

See also
 Two-hander, a drama with only two characters; includes a list of television episodes
 Clip show, an episode composed of excerpts from previous episodes; often a bottle-episode frame story in which characters reminisce about the earlier events.
 Filler (media)

Footnotes

References

External links
 

Television terminology
1960s neologisms
Film and video terminology